De Zalm is the oldest inn in Gouda city, South Holland, Netherlands. 

In 1551, the inn was called the Old Salm or Gilded Salm. In 1688 was built the historic Waag building by the architect Pieter Post located next to the tavern.

The word zalm means salmon and its statue was returned to the roof in 2006.

The building was enrolled as a national monument on 28 March 1966 in the monument register.

See also 
List of oldest companies

References 

Article contains translated text from De Zalm on the Dutch Wikipedia retrieved on 25 February 2017.

External links 

Location on Google Maps

Hotels in the Netherlands
Restaurants in the Netherlands
Companies established in the 16th century
16th-century establishments in the Netherlands